Bad Seeds is a Canadian comedy film, directed by Louis Bélanger and released in 2016.

The film stars Alexis Martin as Jacques, a struggling actor from Montreal who is forced to flee the city because of his unpaid gambling debts to a loan shark (Luc Picard), and ends up a partner with Simon (Gilles Renaud) and Francesca (Emmanuelle Lussier-Martinez) in a marijuana farm.

The film's cast also includes Myriam Côté, Patrick Hivon, Stéphane Jacques, Yves Bélanger, Bénédicte Décary, François Papineau, Sylvio Archambault and Gary Boudreault.

Accolades

The film garnered four nominations at the 5th Canadian Screen Awards in 2017, including Best Motion Picture.

References

External links
 

2016 films
2016 comedy films
Canadian films about cannabis
Canadian comedy films
Films directed by Louis Bélanger
French-language Canadian films
2010s Canadian films